Ziad Youssef Fazah (born 10 June 1954) is an alleged Liberian-born Lebanese polyglot. Fazah has falsely claimed to speak 59 languages and maintains that he has proved this in several public appearances in which he supposedly communicated with native speakers of a large number of foreign languages. According to Fazah, a Greek Orthodox, his abilities to learn languages are a gift bestowed to him by God.  He currently lives in Porto Alegre, Brazil.

The Guinness Book of World Records, up to the 1998 edition, listed Fazah as being able to speak and read 58 languages, citing a live interview in Athens, Greece in July 1991, but has since removed his name from any language-linked records.

Polyglot claims
Ziad Fazah has claimed that he can speak, read, write and understand the following languages: 

However, he stated in 2015 that at the time he could only fluently speak fifteen of those languages without preparing himself, which were Arabic, French, English, German, Spanish, Italian, Portuguese, Russian, Polish, Norwegian, Danish, Hebrew, Chinese, Swedish and Croatian.

Viva el Lunes test
In 1997, Fazah's polyglot abilities were tested in the Chilean TV program Viva el lunes. The program was in Spanish and ambassadors and other guests from all over the world asked him questions in Egyptian Arabic, Finnish, Russian, Chinese, Persian, Hindi and Greek. He failed in fully understanding and properly answering all of them but the first in his native Arabic. These included:
The Greek question "Πόσες μέρες θα μείνετε εδώ στη Χιλή;" ("How many days are you going to stay here in Chile?"),
The Russian question "Какой сегодня день недели?" ("What day of the week is it today?"). Fazah only repeated the word "какой?"
The Persian anthem Ey Iran and sentence "می‌خواهم از آقای زیاد سؤال کنم که شما در آموختن زبان فارسی, فقط لغات عادی را یاد گرفتید, یا این که, سعی کردید, در فرهنگ فارسی را رخنه کرده فمثلاً, بعضی از شعرای فارسی را بشناسید؟" ("I want to ask Mr. Ziad if in order to learn the Persian language, did you learn only the simple words or you to try to get into Persian culture, for example, to know some Persian poets?"),
The Finnish question "Mm. Koko maailmassa on noin viisi miljoonaa ihmistä, jotka puhuvat suomen kieltä. Varmaan myös tiedät, että Suomessa puhutaan virallisesti suomea, ruotsia ja saamen kieltä. Tiedätte varmaan myös - tunnette suomalaista kulttuuria. Nyt kysyn teiltä, mistä pidätte eniten suomalaisessa kulttuurissa? Mikä on Suomessa parasta?" ("In the whole world there are about 5 million people who speak Finnish. You probably also know that the officially spoken languages in Finland are Finnish, Swedish and the Sami language. Also, you probably know about Finnish culture. Now, I ask you, what do you like the most in Finnish culture? What's best in Finland?")
The Mandarin Chinese question "在月球上，能够看到唯一的地球上的人造工程是什么？" ("What is the only man-made structure visible from the moon?"), of which the purported answer would be the Great Wall of China.
Lastly in Hindi, he was asked to translate what जिओ सोमवार ("Long live Monday!", the name of the show he was on) meant, which he failed to guess.
Besides failing to understand the question or any of the spoken Persian, Fazah also failed the reading test in Persian he was given, as he pronounced the letters as one would in Arabic, which is inaccurate since the Persian alphabet is unique with additional letters not found in Arabic.

In a 2020 interview, Fazah defended himself regarding this event, which he called a "betrayal". He claimed that the show's organizers did not inform him he would be tested and even that it would be conducted in languages other than Spanish, so he did not have time to prepare himself to properly answer the questions.

See also
Polyglotism
List of polyglots

References

Notes

External links
 
 

Living people
Liberian people of Lebanese descent
Lebanese emigrants to Brazil
1954 births
People from Monrovia
People from Rio de Janeiro (city)